Ian Wilson (born 26 December 1964) is an Irish composer.

Career
Wilson was born in Belfast, studied violin and piano, and graduated with a DPhil in composition from the University of Ulster at Jordanstown in 1990, where he was a research fellow, 2000–3. He has been a composer-in-residence with Leitrim County Council and was music director of the Sligo New Music Festival from 2003 to 2011. He received the Macaulay Fellowship from the Arts Council of Ireland in 1992, and in 1998 he was elected to Aosdána, Ireland's academy of creative artists. Since 2009, he has been a post-doctoral research fellow at Dundalk Institute of Technology, investigating aspects of traditional (ethnic) Irish performance practice as basis for new works of art music.

Wilson's music has been performed at the BBC Proms, Venice Biennale, ISCM World Music Days and the Ultima Festival in Oslo and by such diverse groups as the RTÉ National Symphony Orchestra, the London Mozart Players, the Irish Chamber Orchestra, the pianist Hugh Tinney and many others.

He has recorded many albums, including two releases for Diatribe Records.

Recordings

Bibliography
Axel Klein: Die Musik Irlands im 20. Jahrhundert (Hildesheim: Georg Olms, 1996)
Gareth Cox, Axel Klein (eds.): Irish Music in the Twentieth Century (= Irish Musical Studies vol. 7) (Dublin: Four Courts Press, 2004)

References

External links
 Official site for Ian Wilson
 Ian Wilson at Ricordi London
 Ian Wilson biography and works on the UE website (publisher)
 Ian Wilson at the Contemporary Music Centre of Ireland

1964 births
20th-century classical composers
21st-century classical composers
Alumni of Ulster University
Aosdána members
Classical composers from Northern Ireland
Composers from Northern Ireland
Irish classical composers
Irish male classical composers
Living people
Male opera composers
Musicians from Belfast
Opera composers from Northern Ireland
20th-century male musicians
21st-century male musicians